Star Wars: The Empire Strikes Back is a video game released for the Nintendo Entertainment System in 1992. It is the sequel the original Star Wars for the NES. This is the second of three video games released under the Empire Strikes Back title that were developed directly for home video game systems. It was preceded by a version for the Atari 2600 and succeeded by Super Star Wars: The Empire Strikes Back for the Super NES.

After the game was completed, the developers were occupied making Super Star Wars for the Super NES, so a corresponding NES sequel covering the film Return of the Jedi was never developed, nor released.

A version of the game was released for the Game Boy. It was reprinted and distributed by several publishers over the course of three years.

On July 26, 2019, the NES and Game Boy versions were officially re-released in both standard and Collector's Edition sets with Disney and Lucasfilms's approval in limited quantities on unlicensed replica game cartridges by Limited Run Games.

Gameplay

The objective of the game is to destroy an Imperial Probe Droid, escape a Wampa-infested ice cavern, fight during the Battle of Hoth, meet Master Yoda on Dagobah to train with him, and attempt to rescue friendly characters in Cloud City from Darth Vader.

Unlike the previous game, the player can only control Luke Skywalker, who can fight with a blaster pistol or a lightsaber, and who can also board a snowspeeder during the Battle of Hoth. As Luke learns about the Force, he develops multiple Force Powers that will help him during his mission.

The ending is significantly more upbeat than the movie's ending, as the player must both rescue Han Solo and defeat Darth Vader in combat in order to win.

Reception

Glenn Rubenstein of Wizard magazine praised the game's plot staying true to the movie although criticizing the punching and jumping levels being somewhat boring concluding: "but the more diverse sequences more than make up for it." Power Unlimited gave the Game Boy version 75% writing: "Empire Strikes Back for the Game Boy is mainly more of the same, compared to its predecessor Star Wars. Nevertheless, it is a fun game, although the worlds are very similar."

References

External links

1992 video games
Action video games
Adventure games
Capcom games
The Empire Strikes Back video games
Game Boy games
LucasArts games
Nintendo Entertainment System games
NMS Software games
Platform games
Single-player video games
Ubisoft games
Video games developed in the United States